Kwethluk is a city in Bethel Census Area in the U.S. state of Alaska. At the 2010 census the population was 721, up from 713 in 2000.

Geography

Kwethluk is located at  (60.802332, -161.418556). It lies at the confluence of the Kuskokwim and Kwethluk rivers in the Yukon-Kuskokwim Delta. The constantly changing channel gives the village its name: Kwethluk is derived from the Yupik kuik, meaning "river", plus -rrluk, meaning "bad, unnatural".

Demographics

Kwethluk first appeared on the 1880 U.S. Census as the unincorporated Eskimo village of Kuljkhlugamute. It did not appear again until 1940 as the village of "Quithlook." The spelling was changed in 1950 to Kwethluk and the village formally incorporated as a city in 1975.

As of the census of 2000, there were 713 people, 153 households, and 132 families residing in the city. There were 199 housing units at an average density of 19.9 per square mile (7.7/km2). The racial makeup of the city was 4.77% White, 0.14% Black or African American, 92.85% Native American, 0.28% Asian, and 1.96% from two or more races.

There were 153 households, out of which 62.1% had children under the age of 18 living with them, 57.5% were married couples living together, 20.3% had a female householder with no husband present, and 13.1% were non-families. 10.5% of all households were made up of individuals, and none had someone living alone who was 65 years of age or older. The average household size was 4.66 and the average family size was 5.08.

In the city, the age distribution of the population shows 47.7% under the age of 18, 9.4% from 18 to 24, 24.7% from 25 to 44, 12.5% from 45 to 64, and 5.8% who were 65 years of age or older. The median age was 20 years. For every 100 females, there were 116.7 males. For every 100 females age 18 and over, there were 113.1 males.

The median income for a household in the city was $25,417, and the median income for a family was $27,500. Males had a median income of $24,063 versus $14,375 for females. The per capita income for the city was $6,503. About 29.2% of families and 29.5% of the population were below the poverty line, including 31.4% of those under age 18 and 35.9% of those age 65 or over.

Education
It is served by the K-12 Ket'acik & Aapalluk Memorial School, operated by the Lower Kuskokwim School District.  it has about 250 students and 15 teachers.

References

External links 

Cities in Bethel Census Area, Alaska
Cities in Alaska